() (Changsing) is a major island located in the eastern part of Bohai Sea, off the coast of Wafangdian, Dalian, Liaoning, China. It has a population of around 60,000.

General 
Changxing Island is located in the eastern part of Bohai Sea, off the coast of Wafangdian, Dalian, Liaoning. It is the sixth largest island in Greater China and the largest island north of the Chongming Island on the Yangtze River.

Traditionally based on fishing and agriculture, its economy suddenly changing to distribution, industrial and resort development.

Dalian Changxing Island Seaport Industrial Area 
This industrial area consists of Changxing, Jiaoliu and three other islands, a total area of 350 square kilometers.  It was made a Provincial Economic Development Zone by the Liaoning provincial government in January, 2002, and later in 2006, was made part of the "Five Points, One Line" industrial zone development plan.  Its management committee was established by the Dalian municipal government in May, 2005.

There are already the following projects:

 Connection by a bridge to the mainland
 International golf course (Dalian Changxing Island Golf Resort, Japan)
 Limestone mining (Nittetsu Mining, Japan)
 Large seaport
 Large shipbuilding (STX Corporation, Korea)
 Oxygen plant (Taiyo Nippon Sanso Corporation, Japan)
 Petrochemical complex
 Wind power station

See also 
 China National and Provincial Economic and Technological Development Zones

External links 
 
 Dalian Changxing Island Seaport Industrial Area

Bohai Sea
Wafangdian
Islands of Liaoning
Special Economic Zones of China